Federico Veiroj (born 1976 in Montevideo) is a Uruguayan film director, screenwriter, producer, and actor.

Veiroj studied Communications at the UCUDAL. Two of his films have been submitted for the Academy Award for Best International Feature Film.

Filmography
As director
The Moneychanger (2019)
Belmonte (2018)
The Apostate (2015)
A Useful Life (2010)
Acne (2008)

As screenwriter
Belmonte (2018)
The Apostate (2015)
A Useful Life (2010)
Acne (2008)

As actor
25 Watts (2001) as Gerardito

Awards
2018: Best Script - Mar del Plata International Film Festival, for Belmonte
2015: FIPRESCI Award - San Sebastián International Film Festival, for The Apostate
2010: Coral Award - Havana Film Festival, for A Useful Life
2010: Best Director - Valdivia International Film Festival, for A Useful Life
2010: Fraternity Award granted by B'nai B'rith Uruguay

References

External links

1976 births
Living people
People from Montevideo
Catholic University of Uruguay alumni
Uruguayan film directors
Uruguayan film producers
Uruguayan film actors
Uruguayan screenwriters
Fraternity Award